Mogensen is a surname of Danish origin which may refer to:

People
Allan Mogensen, Danish orienteering competitor, winner of the 1993 World Orienteering Championship
Andreas Mogensen (born 1976), first Dane selected as astronaut by the European Space Agency
Børge Mogensen (1914–1972), Danish furniture designer
Carsten Mogensen (born 1983), male badminton player from Denmark
Grete Mogensen, retired female badminton player from Denmark
Halldóra Mogensen (born 1979), Icelandic politician
Joëlle Mogensen (1953–1982), popular singer of French songs
John Mogensen (1928–1977), Danish singer, song writer and pianist
Thomas Mogensen (born 1983), Danish team handball player

Other
Mogensen-Scott encoding, a way to embed inductive datatypes in the lambda calculus

Danish-language surnames